Sisters in Islam (SIS) is a Malaysian registered company committed to promoting the rights of women within the frameworks of Islam and universal human rights. Its efforts to promote the rights of Muslim women are based on the principles of equality, justice and freedom enjoined by the Quran. SIS work focuses on challenging laws and policies made in the name of Islam that discriminate against women. As such it tackles issues covered under Malaysia's Islamic family and sharia laws, such as polygamy, child marriage, moral policing, Islamic legal theory and jurisprudence, the hijab and modesty, violence against women and hudud. It is noted for its Islamic feminist research and advocacy.

History

"If God is just as Islam is just, why do laws and policies made in the name of Islam create injustice?" This was the burning question faced by the founding members of Sisters in Islam (SIS) when they began their search for solutions to the problem of discrimination against Muslim women in the name of Islam.

SIS was formed in 1988 and registered as a non-governmental organisation in 1993 under the name SIS Forum Malaysia. The name Sisters in Islam is retained as an authorship name.

Sisters in Islam was co-founded by seven women: Zainah Anwar, Amina Wadud, Askiah Adam, Norani Othman, Rashidah Abdullah, Rose Ismail and Sharifah Zuriah Aljeffri. Other members have included activists such as Toni Kasim.

Activities
Today, SIS areas of work have expanded to encompass larger issues of democracy, human rights and constitutionalism, as well as urging the observance of human rights principles and international treaties and conventions signed by the Malaysian Government. SIS then began to take public positions of critical importance in the face of attempts to prosecute Muslims attempting to leave Islam, and efforts to silence differing opinions in Islam. 

"Telenisa" is a free legal advice service by phone and WhatsApp to help women (and men) with Shariah Islamic Family Law.

Underlying these activities was the firm belief that, as a concerned group working towards a better society, SIS could not isolate itself from the larger human rights and democratic movements in the country. A movement for gender justice must necessarily be a part of the larger human rights movement, and vice versa. The protection and expansion of the democratic space enabling a civil society to thrive "and upholding the fundamental liberties of the Malaysian Constitution"  are the responsibilities of all citizens, for it is precisely these liberties that have enabled groups like SIS to exist.

Through the expertise of mufassirah (an expert in tafsir, 'interpretation') Amina Wadud, the group engaged actively in a model of Qur'anic hermeneutics that examined the socio-historical context of Revelation as a whole, and that of particular Qur'anic verses. The group examined the language of the Text and its syntactical and grammatical structure, and it looked at the Text as a whole to understand its worldview. This combined methodology allowed an exciting interface to emerge between theology and interpretation on one hand, and daily realities of Muslim women within the contemporary socio-legal context on the other. Empowered by their knowledge, the women were compelled to share their findings with the public in an effort to break the dominant belief that Islam discriminated against women.

Their mission is to promote the principles of gender equality, justice, freedom, and dignity of Islam and empower women to be advocates for change. They seek to promote a framework of women's rights in Islam which takes into consideration women's experiences and realities; they want to eliminate the injustice and discrimination that women may face by changing the mindsets that may hold women to be inferior to men; and they want to increase public knowledge, and reform laws and policies within the framework of justice and equality in Islam.

The Sisters in Islam leaders hold the following: "We uphold the revolutionary spirit of Islam, a religion which uplifted the status of women when it was revealed 1400 years ago. We believe that Islam does not endorse the oppression of women and denial of their basic rights of equality and human dignity. We are deeply saddened that religion has been used to justify cultural practices and values that regard women as inferior and subordinate to men and we believe that this has been made possible because men have had exclusive control over the interpretation of the text of the Qur’an."

Criticism
SIS has drawn criticism from conservative Muslim state and non-state actors because of its views. Its position, for example, in promoting monogamy as a Quranic ideal, was challenged by the Department of Islamic Development (JAKIM). The group has also drawn the ire of the Pan-Malaysian Islamic Party (PAS) for criticising PAS' Kelantan Syariah Criminal Bill (H) 1993 on the basis that it discriminated against Malaysian women and imposed the death penalty for apostasy. PAS, in 2009, called for SIS to be investigated and for its members to be "rehabilitated".

In 2010, Malaysian Assembly of Mosque Youth (MAMY) brought a lawsuit against Sisters in Islam, alleging the misuse of the word "Islam" in the organization's name. The High Court, however, struck out the application.  Other right wing groups have  alleged that Sisters in Islam misinterprets religious principles in response to SIS' efforts to stop authorities from caning a woman who was sentenced by the Syariah Court for drinking beer in public.

In 2014, the Selangor Islamic Religious Council (MAIS) issued a fatwa declaring that Sisters In Islam, as well as any other organisation promoting religious liberalism and pluralism, deviate from the teachings of Islam. According to the edict, publications that are deemed to promote liberal and pluralistic religious thinking are to be declared unlawful and confiscated, while social media is also to be monitored and restricted. As fatwas are legally binding in Malaysia, SIS is challenging it on constitutional grounds.

See also 
 Aurat (Malay language)
 Feminism in Malaysia
 Gerwani
 Hermenautics of feminism in Islam
 Musawah
 Women in Malaysia
 Zainah Anwar

References

Further reading

 Ong, Aihwa and Peletz, Michael G. (1995). Bewitching Women, Pious Men. University of California Press. 
 A sister steps out, The Star, March 30, 2008.
 Khalid Chraibi: Reforming Islamic family law within the religious framework - Sisters in Islam's "best practices" strategy - Tabsir.net
 Khalid Chraibi: The king, the mufti & the Facebook girl - a power play. Who decides what is licit in Islam? - CyberOrient.net
 Khalid Chraibi: Sisters in Islam - Women cite Quranic rights to confront culture of oppression - SaudiDebate.com

Feminist organisations in Malaysia
Islamic organisations based in Malaysia
1988 establishments in Malaysia